The following radio stations broadcast on FM frequency 107.3 MHz:

Argentina
 City in Jujuy
 Impacto in Bella Vista, Corrientes
 Las Rosas in Córdoba
 Magic Box in Miramar, Buenos Aires
 Master's in Tierra del Fuego, Ushuaia
 Max in Wheelwright, Santa Fe
 RH1 Integracion in Córdoba
 Rck in Resistencia, Chaco
 Tinkunaco in José C. Paz, Buenos Aires

Australia
 2REM in Albury, New South Wales
 2SER in Sydney, New South Wales
 4CAB in Gold Coast, Queensland
 5RRR in Woomera, South Australia
 ABC Classic FM in Darwin, Northern Territory
 ABC Classic FM in Toowoomba, Queensland
 ABC NewsRadio in Port Lincoln, South Australia
 7XXX in Hobart, Tasmania
 6HFM in Perth, Western Australia
 Radio National in Charleville, Queensland
 Radio National in Cooktown, Queensland
 Radio National in Mount Isa, Queensland
 Radio National in Roma, Queensland

Canada (Channel 297)
 CBAF-FM-9 in Yarmouth, Nova Scotia
 CBSI-FM-18 in St-August-Saguenay, Quebec
 CBTK-FM-2 in Grand Forks, British Columbia
 CFGQ-FM in Calgary, Alberta
 CFMH-FM in Saint John, New Brunswick
 CFRT-FM in Iqaluit, Nunavut
 CHBE-FM in Victoria, British Columbia
 CHNC-FM-3 in Perce, Quebec
 CHUK-FM in Pointe-Bleue/Masteuiatsh, Quebec
 CITA-FM-1 in Sussex, New Brunswick
 CITE-FM in Montreal, Quebec
 CJDL-FM in Tillsonburg, Ontario
 CJME-3-FM in Warmley, Saskatchewan
 CJWC-FM in Ucluelet, British Columbia
 CKHR-FM in Hay River, Northwest Territories
 CKOE-FM in Moncton, New Brunswick

China
 Beijing Public Service Radio in Beijing
 CNR Music Radio in Guiyang

Malaysia
 Buletin FM in Alor Setar, Kedah and Perlis
 Fly FM in Kota Bharu, Kelantan
 Melody in Malacca and Northern Johor

Mexico
 XEQR-FM in Mexico City
 XHARDJ-FM in Arandas, Jalisco
 XHCIF-FM in Calvillo, Aguascalientes
 XHFG-FM in Tijuana, Baja California
 XHGTS-FM in Nuevo Laredo, Tamaulipas
 XHSCAG-FM in Cananea, Sonora
 XHSCAI-FM in Santa Clara del Cobre, Salvador Escalante, Michoacán
 XHSCBN-FM in San Felipe, Guanajuato
 XHSCKI-FM in Santa Cruz Amilpas, Oaxaca
 XHSIAB-FM in San Felipe de la Peña, San Juan Bautista Tuxtepec, Oaxaca
 XHUJAT-FM in Villahermosa, Tabasco

New Zealand
Various low-power stations up to 1 watt

Paraguay
ZPV137 at Areguá

United Kingdom
 Lionheart Radio in Alnwick, Northumberland
 Stafford FM in Stafford, Staffordshire
  in Leamington Spa
  in Prestatyn
  in Swansea

United States (Channel 297)
 KAJE in Ingleside, Texas
 KANY in Cosmopolis, Washington
 KAPN (FM) in Caldwell, Texas
 KBBK in Lincoln, Nebraska
 KBFG-LP in Seattle, Washington
 KCHR-FM in Cotton Plant, Arkansas
 KCVE-LP in Conroe, Texas
 KCZY in Crownpoint, New Mexico
 KEVM-FM in Junction, Texas
 KFFM in Yakima, Washington
 KFIP-LP in Kailua-Kona, Hawaii
 KFXR-FM in Chinle, Arizona
 KGRS in Burlington, Iowa
 KHSA-LP in Hot Springs, Arkansas
 KHYY in Minatare, Nebraska
 KIMO in Townsend, Montana
 KIOW in Forest City, Iowa
 KISX in Whitehouse, Texas
 KIXW-FM in Lenwood, California
 KIYK in Saint George, Utah
 KJAS (FM) in Jasper, Texas
 KLFX in Nolanville, Texas
 KLSI in Mooreland, Oklahoma
 KLVS in Livermore, California
 KMJK in North Kansas City, Missouri
 KMLM-FM in Grover Beach, California
 KNCP-LP in Lapine, Oregon
 KNEZ in Hazen, Nevada
 KNPQ in Hershey, Nebraska
 KNUJ-FM in Sleepy Eye, Minnesota
 KOMS in Poteau, Oklahoma
 KOOS in North Bend, Oregon
 KQDR in Savoy, Texas
 KQRN in Mitchell, South Dakota
 KQXF in Osceola, Arkansas
 KQZR in Hayden, Colorado
 KRDW-LP in Smith River, California
 KRKV in Las Animas, Colorado
 KRKW-LP in Waimea, Hawaii
 KRTE-FM in Steelville, Missouri
 KSLT in Spearfish, South Dakota
 KSSL in Post, Texas
 KTHR in Wichita, Kansas
 KTNH-LP in Walla Walla, Washington
 KVHH-LP in Turlock, California
 KVRW in Lawton, Oklahoma
 KWJZ-LP in High Rock, Washington
 KWRS-LP in Redlands, California
 KZLI-LP in Little Rock, Arkansas
 KZTO-LP in Burnet, Texas
 WAWB-LP in West Branch, Michigan
 WAWS in Claxton, Georgia
 WBBT-FM in Powhatan, Virginia
 WBRP in Baker, Louisiana
 WBYC-LP in Crisfield, Maryland
 WBZN in Old Town, Maine
 WCAA-LP in Albany, New York
 WCGQ in Columbus, Georgia
 WCLJ-LP in Lafayette, Indiana
 WCMN-FM in Arecibo, Puerto Rico
 WCOH in Du Bois, Pennsylvania
 WCTT-FM in Corbin, Kentucky
 WCWT-FM in Centerville, Ohio
 WDDD-FM in Johnston City, Illinois
 WDKR in Maroa, Illinois
 WEGH in Northumberland, Pennsylvania
 WFCG in Tylertown, Mississippi
 WHMN-LP in Plymouth, Pennsylvania
 WJMZ-FM in Anderson, South Carolina
 WJUC in Swanton, Ohio
 WKAZ-FM in Miami, West Virginia
 WKFV in Clinton, North Carolina
 WKVB in Westborough, Massachusetts
 WKVU in Utica, New York
 WLVW in Washington, District of Columbia
 WMGL in Ravenel, South Carolina
 WMUD-LP in Moriah, New York
 WMVK-LP in Perryville, Maryland
 WNBL in South Bristol, New York
 WNWV in Elyria, Ohio
 WNXR in Iron River, Wisconsin
 WOUG-LP in Douglas, Georgia
 WPUR in Atlantic City, New Jersey
 WQLT-FM in Florence, Alabama
 WQZZ in Boligee, Alabama
 WRGV in Pensacola, Florida
 WRSW-FM in Warsaw, Indiana
 WRWD-FM in Highland, New York
 WRZI in Hodgenville, Kentucky
 WRZQ-FM in Greensburg, Indiana
 WSJY in Fort Atkinson, Wisconsin
 WTNR in Greenville, Michigan
 WTRZ in Spencer, Tennessee
 WUPF in Powers, Michigan
 WVIE (FM) in Charlotte Amalie, Virgin Islands
 WVRA in Enfield, North Carolina
 WVSZ in Chesterfield, South Carolina
 WWJK in Jacksonville, Florida
 WWQC in Clifton, Illinois
 WXED-LP in Ellwood City, Pennsylvania
 WXGL in Saint Petersburg, Florida
 WXLZ-FM in Lebanon, Virginia
 WYBZ in Crooksville, Ohio
 WZNO-LP in Cleveland, Tennessee

References

Lists of radio stations by frequency